The Ōnahau River is a river of the Tasman Region of New Zealand's South Island. It has its sources close to the track in Kahurangi National Park that follows a ridgeline to Parapara Peak. From here, it flows northeast to reach Golden Bay via a little estuary just east of Rangihaeata. The Little Ōnahau River follows a roughly parallel course to the southwest of the Ōnahau River and has its confluence upstream from the estuary. Upstream from the confluence, both these rivers are crossed by State Highway 60.

See also
List of rivers of New Zealand

References

Rivers of the Tasman District
Kahurangi National Park
Rivers of New Zealand